Vezzano (Vezàn in local dialect) was a comune (municipality) in Trentino in the northern Italian region Trentino-Alto Adige/Südtirol, located about  west of Trento. It was merged with Terlago and Padergnone on January 1, 2016, to form a new municipality, Vallelaghi.

Vezzano borders the following municipalities: Molveno, San Lorenzo in Banale, Trento, Terlago, Padergnone and Calavino.

Demographic evolution

References

External links
 Homepage of the city

Cities and towns in Trentino-Alto Adige/Südtirol